Rayne railway station was located in Rayne, Essex. The station closed in 1952.

History

The station is now the headquarters for the Essex Ranger Service and the visitor centre for the Flitch Way.  The building was listed at Grade II by Historic England in July 2015.

Route

References

Further reading

External links
 Rayne station on Subterranea Britannica

Disused railway stations in Essex
Former Great Eastern Railway stations
Railway stations in Great Britain opened in 1869
Railway stations in Great Britain closed in 1952
Braintree District
1869 establishments in England